The National Lieutenant Governors Association (NLGA) is the non-profit, nonpartisan professional association for elected or appointed officials who are first in line of succession to the governors in the 50 U.S. states and the five organized territories. (The first official in the line of succession is generally established in the state or territorial constitution).

Lieutenant governors 

In 43 states and four territories, this official is a statewide elected lieutenant governor (In 2010 New Jersey elected its first lieutenant governor). In three states and one territory, this official is the state secretary of state. In four states, the president of the state senate (the upper house of the state legislature) is first in line of succession; two of these officials (Tennessee and West Virginia) may statutorily use the title lieutenant governor.

Of the elected lieutenant governors (including New Jersey), 25 are elected on a ticket in the general election with the gubernatorial candidate as a running mate. Most states allow the governor to designate his or her running mate, but in some states, the governor and lieutenant governor run separately in the primary election and are "paired" for the general election. In 18 other states, the lieutenant governor and the governor are elected separately and as a result may be of different political parties. Lieutenant governors typically are acting governor when the governor is out of state. Thirty lieutenant governor are presidents of the state Senate, and of these half may cast tie-breaking votes (mirroring the Federal government of the United States, in which the Vice President of the United States is the president of the United States Senate).

History
The NLGA was founded in 1962, as the National Conference of Lieutenant Governors (NCLG). The organization's first meeting was on December 4, 1962. In 1966, NCLG affiliated with the Council of State Governments (CSG) and was staffed through CSG from 1983 to 1988 with Edward Feigenbaum as director. In 1988, NCLG became financially independent. Gail Manning ran the organization's operations and was named director in 1991; she served until 2002.

In 2002, Julia Hurst became executive director. The same year, the organization adopted its current name and a new logo and launched its website.

The Association was incorporated in Kentucky in January 2013 and assumed independent corporate status and operations July 1, 2013.

Functions
NLGA provides members the opportunity to network, meet, foster interstate cooperation, gain policy knowledge, hone professional skills, share policy work, and promote the effectiveness of the office of lieutenant governor. NLGA does adopt national policy resolutions on subjects of importance to the membership. NLGA Articles provide for the Chairmanship to rotate annually between a Democrat and Republican. The Chair Elect is of the opposite party to the chair and assumes the role of Chair the following year.

The association office is located in Covington, Kentucky. The full membership meets twice a year, annually in Washington, DC for its Federal-State Relations meeting and annually in the summer in a select host state.

In 2007, NLGA was given the prestigious 'Associations Advance America' recognition by the American Society of Association Executives (ASAE). NLGA was determined to have one of the six best association programs in the nation for 'Ending Cervical Cancer in our Lifetime,' a nationwide health care campaign. NLGA has also been recognized for work by Women in Government, the American Cardiology Association, and the American Iron and Steel Institute.

List of chairs of the NLGA

References

External links
Official website

Nonpartisan organizations in the United States
Political organizations based in the United States
Government-related professional associations in the United States
Organizations established in 1962